Attila Katona (born 16 June 1981 in Eger) is a Hungarian football player who currently plays for Eger SE. He joined the club on Jul 7, 2020 on a free transfer.

References

External links
 Profile

1981 births
Living people
Sportspeople from Eger
Hungarian footballers
Association football defenders
Egri FC players
Veszprém LC footballers
Diósgyőri VTK players
Viettel FC players
Debreceni VSC players
BFC Siófok players
Hungarian expatriate footballers
Expatriate footballers in Vietnam
Hungarian expatriate sportspeople in Vietnam